The Post Millennial is a conservative Canadian online news magazine started in 2017. It publishes national and local news and has a large amount of opinion content. It has been criticized for publishing false and misleading stories, including on COVID-19 as well as its opaque funding and political connections.

History 
The Post Millennial was founded in 2017 by Matthew Azrieli and Ali Taghva. The site's Facebook presence expanded rapidly between June 2018 and May 2019, with page interactions growing from 36,000 to 194,000 per month. Meanwhile, a new office was sited in Montreal, and the organization planned for another expansion into Toronto in 2020. In May 2019, Jeff Ballingall, a former political campaigner for Ontario Premier Doug Ford, was hired as the company's Chief Marketing Officer. A media study by Canada's National Observer found that 8 per cent of Conservative respondents read The Post Millennial.

The Post Millennial is backed by private investors.

In May 2022, The Post Millennial was acquired by Human Events Media Group, which also owns Human Events, an American conservative news website.

Content 
The Post Millennial provides both national and regional news. It runs stories on politics and culture. Its opinion section is a significant portion of its content, and conservative figures such as Barbara Kay have written opinions for the outlet. According to a CBC report published in 2019, much of the news content provided by The Post Millennial is reused from other media outlets with no additional reporting.

The website Bellingcat described an article The Post Millennial published during the 2019 Australia fires as disinformation. Conspiracy theorist Paul Joseph Watson released a false story alleging that the wildfires resulted in large part from arson. The Post Millennial used Watson's story as a basis for their own reporting, alleging that "legal action" had been taken against 183 people during the bushfires. Bellingcat argued that their presentation "did not botch the basic facts" but was misleading.

In July 2020, The Post Millennial reported on the fatal shooting of a Black Lives Matter protester in Texas. The site's story alleged that the victim had shot first, based in large part on tweets by Ian Miles Cheong and prominent QAnon conspiracist "In the Matrixx". Both Twitter users later took down their tweets, and The Post Millennial subsequently issued a correction. However, The Daily Dot said that the site still attempts to blame the deceased man as the instigator, and The Daily Dot describes this propagation of content as an example of how "disinformation circulated by fringe groups to support their preferred narrative—that Black Lives Matter protesters are violent and lawless—works its way into the conservative media ecosystem and up to the White House". Data analysis performed by Politico and the Institute for Strategic Dialogue on media in the lead-up to the 2020 presidential election in the United States found that the most prominent figures claiming violence by Black Lives Matter and claiming fraudulent ballots, James O'Keefe and Turning Point USA, were platformed and propagated prominently by The Post Millennial.

In July 2020, The Daily Beast exposed an online network pushing United Arab Emirates propaganda against Qatar, Turkey, and Iran using op-eds placed in news outlets using fictitious authors. The Post Millennial published one of these articles under the fake persona "Joseph Labba". In response, Post Millennial states: “It appears we were caught up in an operation involving false identities that involved 46 other outlets including The Washington Examiner and The Hill Times….The submission was evaluated by a member of our editorial team and deemed to be a meritorious submission… [and] a well-written, well-reasoned opinion piece about an important issue…. We stand by the decision to run it and we will be putting the piece back up shortly under The Post Millennial’s byline.” 

Many of their articles use aggregated content from other new sources, social media sites, and press releases with "inflammatory headlines" that have been described as rage baitused by "far-right social media".

In 2021, The Post Millennial played a key role in creating a viral story in right-wing media where it was falsely claimed that some members of the US women's soccer team had disrespected a 98-year-old World War II veteran when he played the Star-Spangled Banner prior to a game. Other media outlets showed that the players turned towards a U.S. flag while he played. After the story had been corrected by other media outlets, the Post Millennial did correct its headline and story to acknowledge the criticism and saying that some players had not turned towards the flag.

In August 2021, amid the COVID-19 pandemic, The Post Millennial ran a story misleadingly implying that unvaccinated high school students in the Eatonville, Washington public school system were forced to wear ankle monitors; in fact, unvaccinated students were not specifically targeted, the devices were proximity monitors that do not track location, staff also wore them, they were required only while participating in high and moderate contact indoor sports, and the devices were similar to those in use by the NFL, NBA, and Major League Baseball.  After being contacted, the Post Millennial updated their headline but did not add a correction statement.

Staff 
Andy Ngo has been editor-at-large since 2019. Ngo was previously with Quillette. Several advertisers such as Logitech pulled ads from the site due to its association with Ngo.

Yaakov Pollak, a former provincial Conservative Party candidate, joined the media group in July 2019. Pollak ran a variety of Conservative Party-affiliated Facebook groups, including the Liberty Now and the Elect Conservatives groups. Pollak did not declare his connection to these pages, and until he was contacted by interested media groups, the majority of content on those pages was sourced from The Post Millennial.

The Post Millennial employed Cosmin Dzsurdzsa as among its first hires from late 2018 to September 2019, by which point he had written over 500 articles for the site. After the National Observer asked The Post Millennial about Dzsurdzsa's previous articles published in Russia Insider and his work for Free Bird Media, sites known for pro-Kremlin propaganda and platforming of white supremacists, respectively, the publication parted ways with Dzsurdzsa.

References

Further reading

External links 
 

2017 establishments in Quebec
Magazines established in 2017
Magazines published in Montreal
Online magazines published in Canada
Conservative magazines published in Canada
Internet properties established in 2017
COVID-19 misinformation